Universitetet Blindern is a tram stop on the Ullevål Hageby Line of the Oslo Tramway. It is located on the north side of Blindern, the main campus of the University of Oslo, Norway.

The station opened on 1 June 1999 as part of the extension of the Ullevål Hageby Line to Rikshospitalet. It was formerly named Blindern nord. It is served by line 17 and 18, using SL95 low-floor trams, giving the station step-free access to the vehicles.

References

Oslo Tramway stations in Oslo
Railway stations opened in 1999
1999 establishments in Norway